John Adam Porter (1894–1952) was the first Scotsman to win the Isle of Man TT motorcycle race, and was a European Grand Prix motorcycle racing champion.

Career 

From 1922 to 1940 he also marketed his own brand of motorcycle, New Gerrard. Riding these bikes, he competed in the 1922 Junior TT, but retired early. During practices for the 1927 TT races, he suffered a badly cut face after a collision with a Norton motorcycle ridden by H. Mathews.

He also won the Belgian motorcycle Grand Prix at 250cc three times, in 1925, 1926 and 1929 and the same class in the German motorcycle Grand Prix of 1926. He was 250 cc motorcycle European champion for 1925 and 1926.

Legacy 

Porter died on 20 November 1952 and is buried at Comely Bank Cemetery, Edinburgh, along with his wife Margaret.

Glasgow Museums have Porter's New Gerrard Blackburne 248cc of 1923 in their collection, having acquired it in 1976. , it is in storage, and so not on public display.

In 2008, two albums of photographs and postcards of TT races, from 1921 onwards, which once belonged to Porter, were sold at auction by Bonhams for £3,220 (including premium). In 2012, his granddaughter showed some of his trophies and other memorabilia, on the BBC programme Antiques Roadshow.

References 

British motorcycle racers
Scottish sportsmen
1894 births
1952 deaths